Charles Robbins Mertz Jr. (born December 4, 1996) is an American soccer player who plays as a midfielder for USL Championship club Pittsburgh Riverhounds SC.

Career

College and amateur
Mertz played four years of college soccer at the University of Michigan between 2015 and 2018.

Mertz also played with Premier Development League sides Chicago FC United and Burlingame Dragons.

Professional
On January 14, 2019, Mertz was selected 76th overall in the 2019 MLS SuperDraft by Colorado Rapids. However, he was released by the club during their pre-season.

Mertz signed his first professional deal with USL Championship club Pittsburgh Riverhounds on March 29, 2019.

On January 12, 2021, Mertz moved to USL Championship side Atlanta United 2. Mertz quickly became a fixture for Atlanta 2, wearing the captain's armband often in 2021 and in every match he played in 2022.

On July 20, 2022, Mertz returned to Pittsburgh Riverhounds SC in exchange for conditional compensation.

References

1996 births
Living people
American soccer players
Association football midfielders
Atlanta United 2 players
Burlingame Dragons FC players
Chicago FC United players
Colorado Rapids draft picks
Michigan Wolverines men's soccer players
Pittsburgh Riverhounds SC players
Soccer players from Pittsburgh
USL Championship players
USL League Two players